Aaviri is a 2019 Indian Telugu-language horror thriller film written, directed, and produced by Ravi Babu. The film features Neha Chauhan, Ravi Babu, Sri Muktha, Bharani Shankar, and Mukhtar Khan in principal roles. Aaviri was released on 1  November 2019.

Plot

Raj (Ravi Babu) and his wife Leena (Neha Chauhan) move into an old palatial house along with their younger daughter Munni (Baby Sri Muktha), after an accidental death of their elder daughter Shruti. Munni happens to see the ghost of her father’s death employee who had died due to Munni’s father. The ghost tries to drive Munni away from the house and eventually succeeds. What happens next forms the rest of the story.

Cast
 Ravi Babu as Raj
 Neha Chauhan as Leena
 Baby Sri Muktha as Munni
 Priya Vadlamani as Jahnvi
 Himaja as Kamala
 Bharani Shankar
 Mukhtar Khan

Reviews

The movie generally received negative reviews with critics labelling it dull, predictable and outdated.

References

External links 
 

2010s Telugu-language films
2019 films
Indian horror thriller films
2019 horror thriller films
Films directed by Ravi Babu